A lament is a song, poem, or piece of music expressing grief, regret, or mourning.

Lament(s) may also refer to:

Literature
 Laments (Kochanowski), a 16th-century series of threnodies
 "The Lament", or Li Sao, a Chinese poem

Music 
 Lament bass, a free musical form

Bands
 Lament (band), a Mexican band

Albums 
 Lament (Einstürzende Neubauten album), 2014
 Lament (Frank Morgan album), 1986
 Lament (I've album), 2003
 Lament (Resurrection Band album), 1995
 Lament (Touché Amoré album), 2020
 Lament (Ultravox album), and the title song (see below), 1984

Songs 
 "Lament" (Ultravox song), 1984
 "Lament", by The Cure, B-side of the single "The Walk"
 "Lament", by Gryphon from  Red Queen to Gryphon Three 
 "Lament", by King Crimson from Starless and Bible Black
 "Lament", by Paul McCartney from Standing Stone
 "Lament", by Tesseract from One
 "Lament", from the musical Evita
 "Lament", composed by J. J. Johnson
 Lamento ('Lament'), a 2002 song by Gian Marco

See also 

 Lamentation (disambiguation)
 Lamentations (disambiguation)
 Laments for Josiah, a biblical passage in 2 Chronicles
 Lamento Borincano ('Puerto Rican Mourning'), a composition by Rafael Hernández Marín